Barkha Madan, now known as Gyalten Samten is an Indian religious monk and nun as well as former model, beauty queen, actress and film producer who has appeared in Hindi and Punjabi language films. She has also appeared in television serials and hosted some TV shows. Impressed by Buddhist ideologies, in November 2012 she had her ordination to become a Buddhist nun and changed her name to Ven. Gyalten Samten.

Early life
Madan was born to a Punjabi family. In 1994, she competed at the Miss India pageant alongside winners Sushmita Sen and Aishwarya Rai. Other participants competed in that year were Priya Gill, Swetha Menon, Jesse Randhawa and Manini De. She received the title of Miss Tourism India where she participated at the inaugural Miss Tourism International pageant. At the end of the pageant, she won third runner-up alongside Malaysian actress and model, Emylia Abdul Hamid who was the runner-up of the said pageant. She made her debut on the big screen with the 1996 Bollywood film Khiladiyon Ka Khiladi with Akshay Kumar and Rekha.

Acting career
Though many offers came to her following her impressive performance in Khiladiyon Ka Khiladi, Barkha preferred to remain selective. She made her entry in foreign films with the Indo-Dutch movie Driving Miss Palmen. It was Ram Gopal Varma's 2003 horror film Bhoot which proved to be a turning point in Barkha's career. The movie became an instant hit. She played  the role of a ghost in the movie, earning praise for her performance.

She started a production and distribution company named Golden Gate LLC, to promote talented independent filmmakers. It produced two critically acclaimed films, Soch Lo  and Surkhaab, with her in the lead. Barkha has also been a popular face in the television industry, appearing in about 20 TV shows.

Turning to spirituality
In November 2012, she set her mind to become a Buddhist nun. She was very much impressed by the ideologies of Buddhism and is an avid follower of the Dalai Lama. She had her ordination from Sera Je Monastery on 4 November under Lama Zopa Rinpoche's supervision. She later commented that it was the most important and right decision she ever made in her life.

Filmography
Khiladiyon Ka Khiladi(1996)
Driving Miss Palmen (1996)
Tera Mera Pyar (1999) 
Bhoot (2003)
Samay: When Time Strikes (2003)
Soch Lo (2010)
Surkhaab (2012)

Notable television works 
1857 Kranti....Rani Laxmibai
Ghar Ek Sapnaa ... Devika
Saat Phere
Nyaay

References

External links
 

Living people
Actresses in Hindi cinema
Actresses in Punjabi cinema
Beauty pageant contestants from India
Indian television actresses
Indian Buddhist nuns
Indian Buddhists
Converts to Buddhism
Punjabi people
Indian television producers
Indian women television producers
Actresses in Hindi television
20th-century Indian actresses
21st-century Indian actresses
21st-century Buddhist nuns
Women television producers
1974 births